The Mineral Products Association (MPA) is the United Kingdom trade association for the aggregates, asphalt, cement, concrete, dimension stone, lime, mortar,  and silica sand industries.

Membership
The Mineral Products Association (MPA) is the trade association for the aggregates, asphalt, cement, concrete, dimension stone, lime, mortar and silica sand industries. With the affiliation of British Precast, the British Association of Reinforcement (BAR), Eurobitume, QPA Northern Ireland, MPA Scotland and the British Calcium Carbonate Federation, it has a growing membership of 480 companies and is the sectoral voice for mineral products. MPA membership is made up of the vast majority of independent SME quarrying companies throughout the UK, as well as the 9 major international and global companies. It covers 100% of UK cement production, 90% of aggregates production, 95% of asphalt and over 70% of ready-mixed concrete and precast concrete production. Each year the industry supplies £20 billion worth of materials and services to the Economy and is the largest supplier to the construction industry, which has annual output valued at £144billion. Industry production represents the largest materials flow in the UK economy and is also one of the largest manufacturing sectors.

History
The Mineral Products Association (MPA) was formed in March 2009 from the merger of the Quarry Products Association, the British Cement Association and The Concrete Centre. MPA was officially launched in June 2009.

Structure

The Mineral Products Association has offices in London, Glasgow and Fron in Wales.

QPA Northern Ireland is affiliated to the MPA and has offices in Crumlin, County Antrim.  The British Precast Concrete Federation (BPCF), the trade Association of precast concrete manufacturers, is a member of the MPA and is based in Leicester.

MPA has regional divisions, for London & South East, South West, East Anglia, Midlands, Wales, North, Scotland and Northern Ireland.

The Concrete Centre
The Concrete Centre was formed in 2003 and since 2009 has been part of the Mineral Products Association. The Concrete Centre promotes the use of concrete in construction through the provision of resources to enable designers to follow best practice for the design of concrete and masonry. The Concrete Centre publishes a journal, Concrete Quarterly which was first published by the Cement and Concrete Association in 1947. The journal showcases the use of concrete in construction projects in the United Kingdom and worldwide. The CQ archive is available online

See also
Concrete Series

References

Trade associations based in the United Kingdom
Organisations based in Hampshire
Engineering organizations
Organizations established in 2009